The Metal Gear franchise features a large number of characters created by Hideo Kojima and designed by Yoji Shinkawa. Its setting features several soldiers with supernatural powers provided by the new advancements of science.

The series initially follows mercenary Solid Snake given government missions of finding the Metal Gear weapon, resulting in encounters in the original Metal Gear games with Gray Fox and Big Boss in Outer Heaven and Zanzibar Land, as well as the original Metal Gear Solid games working with Otacon and Raiden while opposing Liquid Snake's FOXHOUND, Solidus Snake, the Patriots and Revolver Ocelot. Additionally, the Metal Gear Solid prequels follow Big Boss's past as Naked Snake and legend development via Venom Snake as well as the origins of the various aforementioned organizations.

While the original Metal Gear games had their characters designs modeled after Hollywood actors, the Metal Gear Solid games established a series of consistent designs based on Shinkawa's ideas of what would appeal to gamers. Additionally, several of the characters he designs follow Kojima and the other staff's ideas. Critical reception of the game's cast has been positive as publications praised their personalities and roles within the series.

Creation and designs
Much as Metal Gear began as a pastiche of action movies of the time, characters were pastiches of contemporary action movie heroes. Once Yoji Shinkawa started designing the characters in PlayStation's Metal Gear Solid, they were given their respective established visual appearances. As a result of the console's limitations, Shinkawa designed them an idea that would appeal to gamers. Because of the timeskip between titles, a few of the characters have been redesigned to fit in the game's year. With the improvements from new video game consoles like the PlayStation and PlayStation 2, the staff gave the characters a more realistic look starting with Metal Gear Solid 2: Sons of Liberty although they initially had doubts about it. This brought difficulties to the staff as they had to make the faces more realistic. When illustrating characters, Shinkawa does not focus on their minor details, such as the eyes which he sometimes does not try to draw, instead illustrating something more symbolic. While Solid Snake remained easy to illustrate as a result of him having a consistent design to the point Big Boss' younger self, Naked Snake, was conceived making minor changes to the original version of Solid Snake, other characters were more time-consuming owing.

During their debuts, player-characters Solid Snake and Raiden are meant to represent the player while in the following titles they acquire more defined personalities. As a result of the Snake's increasing experience in combat across the series, Kojima attempted creating more challenging antagonists for the boss battles. This resulted in Big Boss' clones from Metal Gear Solid and Metal Gear Solid 2 that had the same abilities as Solid Snake, the legendary Cobra Unit from Metal Gear Solid 3: Snake Eater who participated in World War II and the Beauty and the Beast Corps from Metal Gear Solid 4: Guns of the Patriots that had few human traits. While villains during the first games were given detailed backstories, the Cobra Unit members were intended to have little information known about them, resulting in a significant impact in the gamers upon their deaths following their boss battles. This gave Shinkawa difficulties in conceptualizing their visual appearances as a result of having little to no background details. By Metal Gear Solid 2, Kojima was inspired by the Sherlock Holmes novels to introduce a sidekick character in order to view Snake from a different perspective.

Metal Gear Solid also marks the first time that characters were given voice actors with Solid Snake and Naked Snake being voiced by Akio Ōtsuka. Ōtsuka remembers being surprised during his debut as a result of the large amount of dialogue Snake was given. In the English adaptations, the casting was directed by Kris Zimmerman and supervised by a member from Konami. Solid Snake's voice actor was David Hayter who, despite having issues with some of the dialogue in Metal Gear Solid, became attached to the series.

Various Metal Gear Solid games have remade/expanded upon by titles, such as Metal Gear Solid: The Twin Snakes, Metal Gear Solid: Digital Graphic Novel, Metal Gear Solid 2: Digital Graphic Novel, and Metal Gear Online.

Introduced in Metal Gear

Solid Snake

, real name , is the primary character of the original series. In the original Metal Gear games, he's a rookie member from FOXHOUND given the mission to find and destroy the Metal Gear located within Outer Heaven and Zanzibar Land, leading to confrontations with his comrade Gray Fox both times, as well as Big Boss (the phantom in Outer Heaven and his superior in Zanzibar Land). In the original Metal Gear Solid games, Snake gains a friendship with Otacon while fighting a corrupt FOXHOUND led by his terrorist twin Liquid Snake in Metal Gear Solid, and uses the false name  while assisting Raiden against Solidus Snake and the Patriots in Metal Gear Solid 2: Sons of Liberty. In Metal Gear Solid 4: Guns of the Patriots, he gives himself the nickname  due to his accelerated aging process and is the playable character once more. Solid Snake is voiced by Akio Ōtsuka in the Japanese version and by David Hayter in the English translation.

Big Boss
 is the greatest soldier who ever lived. The Metal Gear Solid games gradually reveal the character to be two individuals: Naked Snake after defeating his legendary war hero mentor, and Venom Snake as a body double.

Gray Fox

First appearing in the original Metal Gear games, he goes missing during the original game with his last transmission being a cryptic message simply saying "Metal Gear", and returns as an enemy in Metal Gear 2: Solid Snake. In Metal Gear Solid, he is revived from death as the Cyborg Ninja to confront and aid Solid Snake several times before finally being killed by Liquid Snake via Metal Gear REX. In the Japanese version, Gray Fox was voiced by Kaneto Shiozawa (Cyborg Ninja; originally), Takumi Yamazaki (Cyborg Ninja; subsequently) and Jun Fukuyama (Null). In the English translation, Gray Fox is voiced by Greg Eagles (Cyborg Ninja; originally), Rob Paulsen (Cyborg Ninja; subsequently) and Larc Spies (Null).

Dr. Madnar
Dr.  is an Eastern engineer responsible for creating the TX-55 Metal Gear mecha in the original Metal Gear, as well as the TX-11 Arnold (Bloody Brad) androids. Dr. Madnar is one of the hostages Snake must rescue along with his daughter . In Metal Gear 2, Dr. Madnar bitterly defects to Zanzibar Land and develops Metal Gear D after being rejected by the scientific community. He comes in contact with Snake in the game while posing as a hostage, but attacks him after the truth is revealed. His name is mentioned in Metal Gear Solid 4 as the scientist who saved Raiden's life after being turned into a cyborg. A character with the same name also plays a supporting role in Hideo Kojima's adventure game Snatcher, although the English-language version for the Sega CD spells his name as Dr. Petrovich Modnar.

Kyle Schneider
He discovers the identity of Outer Heaven's leader, but is silenced before he can mention his name. Solid Snake defeats him during a battle but does not learn his true identity until he collapses. He then reveals to Snake that NATO led a bombing raid against Outer Heaven, not caring about the war orphans or war refugees. Before dying, he also tells Snake that Big Boss had forgiven the resistance for being against him and rescued as many people as he could from the bombings, Outer Heaven personnel and Resistance members alike.

Introduced in Metal Gear 2: Solid Snake

Roy Campbell
 is the second commanding officer of FOXHOUND.

Introduced in Metal Gear 2, he serves as Solid Snake's primary radio contact in the game and gives information about the mission objective and general gameplay tips for Zanzibar Land. In Metal Gear Solid, Campbell has more of a personal stake in the mission on Shadow Moses, as his niece Meryl Silverburgh is held captive by Liquid Snake's revolutionary FOXHOUND. In one of the game's endings, he reveals Meryl is his daughter, the result of an affair between himself and his late brother's wife. In Metal Gear Solid 2, he is impersonated by the "Colonel", Raiden's commanding officer that provides support via codec that's later revealed to be an elaborate AI constructed by supercomputer GW within Arsenal Gear for the Patriots.

Although he is not involved in the main story, the character makes a voice only cameo in Metal Gear Solid 3 during the game over screen scolding the player for causing a time paradox if the player kills certain characters. He also appears in the Ape Escape crossover minigame "Snake vs. Monkey". In Portable Ops, a young version of the character is imprisoned by the FOX unit in South America with Naked Snake. The two escape to recruit Gene's disenfranchised enemy soldiers and other allies into an early version of FOXHOUND.

In Metal Gear Solid 4, Campbell works for a UN Security Council advisory body that monitors PMC activities. He sends Old Snake on an unofficial mission to assassinate Liquid Ocelot in order to put a stop to, providing resources and transportation to complete the mission. He is married to Rosemary which causes a rift between him and Meryl, now aware that Campbell is her father. However, the marriage is a sham used to fool the Patriots and protect Rose's and Raiden's son John. Following the Patriots' destruction, he reconciles with Meryl to walk down the aisle at his daughter's wedding.

Outside the main canon, the character reprises his role as the reluctant commanding officer in the Game Boy Color game Metal Gear: Ghost Babel, a side-story which serves as an alternate sequel to the events of the original Metal Gear. He, Otacon and Mei Ling serve as Solid Snake's codec contacts in Super Smash Bros. Brawl. He also makes a brief codec appearance in a minigame in Ape Escape 3.

Roy Campbell for most Metal Gear Solid games has been voiced by Takeshi Aono in the Japanese version and by Paul Eiding in the English translation. His young version in Portable Ops is voiced by Toshio Furukawa in Japanese and by David Agranov in English. However, Takeshi Aono's death has caused the character's retirement in future Metal Gear Solid games out of respect.

Master Miller
 is a drill instructor and survival coach who was originally Kazuhira Miller, but is impersonated by Liquid Snake in Metal Gear Solid.

Kio Marv
Dr.  is a Czechoslovak biotechnologist. In the backstory of Solid Snake, Marv successfully creates a new algae species called OILIX that could produce petroleum-grade hydrocarbons with little expense and effort. Marv presented the algae to the World Energy Conference in Prague, and was on his way to a demonstration in the United States when he was kidnapped by soldiers from Zanzibar Land. Solid Snake is brought out of retirement by FOXHOUND's new commander, Roy Campbell, and is sent to Zanzibar Land to rescue Dr. Marv. However, he dies of torture in his cell and left behind the OILIX plans for Snake to find.

Holly White
 is an American freelance journalist. Born from a French mother and an English father, she became interested in literature at an early age and was later awarded the Pulitzer Prize for her coverage in Afghanistan plus an Emmy Award (mistakenly referred to in the original manual as a Grammy Award) for her documentary, Unknown Bloodstream. Her newfound fame eventually gets her the attention of the CIA. She infiltrates Zanzibar Land as a journalist and assists Solid Snake over the course of the mission.

Gustava Heffner
, originally named  in the MSX2 version of Metal Gear 2, is a former professional figure skater. Once known as one of the world's best figure skaters (with stints in the world championships and the Olympics under her belt), Heffner was stripped of her competition rights after being caught in an attempt to seek political asylum in Canada with Frank Jaeger. She sought to redeem herself by joining the StB. She is escorting Dr. Marv to America when Zanzibar Land agents hijack their plane. Later in the game, she joins Snake in rescuing Dr Marv, but dies when Jaeger (as Gray Fox in Metal Gear D) destroys the bridge she is on.

George Kasler
 is FOXHOUND's resident strategist and advisor whose military career includes service with mercenaries from South Africa and the French Foreign Legion, plus a short stint in negotiation and combat intelligence-gathering. He is also a veteran of the 1997 Mercenary War of Independence in Zanzibar Land, fighting the CIS Army. Kasler's service earns him a lasting reputation in the mercenary community; only mercenaries who have worked with him can be truly recognized as the best in the world.

Johan Jacobsen
, named  in the MSX2 version, is a zoologist specializing in the preservation of all endangered species. He is the vice-president of the fictional Worldwide Animal Rights Federation and works for the science magazine Maxwell. He is revealed to have been acquainted with Dr Madnar since their days in college and is in Zanzibar Land to study indigenous animals.

Introduced in Metal Gear Solid

Revolver Ocelot

 is a recurring gunslinger antagonist during the Metal Gear Solid games. In the Japanese version, Revolver Ocelot was voiced by Kōji Totani (original depiction), Takumi Yamazaki (younger version), Satoshi Mikami (middle-aged version) and Banjō Ginga (Liquid Ocelot). In the English translation, Revolver Ocelot is voiced by Patric Zimmerman (original depiction and Liquid Ocelot), Joshua Keaton (younger version) and Troy Baker (middle-aged version).

Otacon

, nicknamed , is a recurring character in the Metal Gear Solid series and Solid Snake's close friend. He is introduced in Metal Gear Solid as ArmsTech's employee and Metal Gear REX's engineer that becomes Snake's close ally upon learning of REX's nuclear strike capabilities. Afterwards, he helped Snake with the non-profit Philanthropy organization while dealing with more emotional problems in Metal Gear Solid 2: Sons of Liberty and Metal Gear Solid 4: Guns of the Patriots. Otacon is voiced by Hideyuki Tanaka in the Japanese version and by Christopher Randolph in the English translation.

Naomi Hunter
, nicknamed  by her staff as opposed to the more formal Dr. Hunter, is a geneticist by practice, and specializes in nanotechnology-based gene therapy.

In Metal Gear Solid, she is the chief of FOXHOUND's medical staff and part of the support crew assembled to assist Solid Snake, providing the player with information on the FOXHOUND members Snake faces. Being Gray Fox's adopted sister, she attempted to get revenge on Snake for nearly killing her brother during the original Metal Gear games. When instructed to inject Snake with the FOXDIE virus, she secretly modifies it so that it will kill Snake at a random moment in addition to its original programming. As the game progresses, Naomi realizes that some of her original perceptions of Snake were wrong and is later remorseful for modifying the virus. Uncertain of when exactly the FOXDIE would kill, Naomi tells Snake to live life to the fullest in whatever time there was left. Afterwards, Nastasha Romanenko's account reveals that Naomi was briefly arrested following the Shadow Moses incident until her escape.

In Metal Gear Solid 4, Naomi is working with Liquid Ocelot in order to hijack the SOP battlefield control system, but joins Old Snake's group once again. She becomes romantically involved with Otacon and forms a friendship with Sunny. When they return to Shadow Moses, Naomi reveals that she has been diagnosed with terminal cancer that has been kept in check by nanomachines and, guilt-ridden over her past mistakes, commits suicide by disabling them.

Naomi Hunter is voiced by Hiromi Tsuru in the Japanese version and by Jennifer Hale in the English translation.

Meryl Silverburgh

 is a character based on the character of the same name from Policenauts that was redesigned and reintroduced. She is introduced in Metal Gear Solid as Solid Snake's sidekick/love interest and Roy Campbell's legal niece/biological daughter that's caught in the middle of Liquid Snake's terrorist FOXHOUND. Meryl returns in Metal Gear Solid 4: Guns of the Patriots as Rat Patrol Team One's commander. Meryl Silverburgh is voiced by Kyoko Terase in the Japanese version and by Debi Mae West in the English translation.

Mei Ling 
 is a Chinese-American data analyst. In Metal Gear Solid, she is in charge of saving the player's progress. She invented Solid Snake's wireless communication system, the codec radio, as well as the Soliton Radar, which detects the positions and field of vision of nearby enemy soldiers. Every time Snake saves his data, Mei Ling provides him with advice through Chinese proverbs, as well as quotations from Western authors. In the Japanese version, Mei Ling only quoted Chinese proverbs: she would cite the original proverb in Chinese and then explain its meaning to Snake in Japanese. According to Kojima, this made some of the proverbs redundant after translating them to English, since Mei Ling would be saying the same thing twice. In Metal Gear Solid 2, Mei Ling is part of Philanthropy, an anti-Metal Gear organization, but assists off-screen, attempting to steal equipment from the SSCEN. She makes a voice-only cameo in the game as an easter egg during the Tanker chapter, after the player has saved their progress 13 times. In Metal Gear Solid 4, Mei Ling commands the museum-turned-training vessel USS Missouri and provides Old Snake and Otacon with backup, courtesy of her connections from the SSCEN.

Mei Ling has made a few appearances outside the main series of Metal Gear games. She is a central character in the radio drama version of Metal Gear Solid (set after the events of the original game) and appears in the Game Boy Color version of Metal Gear Solid (a side story not clearly related to the main series). Mei Ling is also one of Snake's support crew in Super Smash Bros. Brawl. Mei Ling is voiced by Houko Kuwashima in the Japanese version and by Kim Mai Guest in the English translation.

Johnny Sasaki
 is a recurring character.

First appearing in Metal Gear Solid, he is an enemy guard whose uniform is stolen by Meryl Silverburgh and again later in the game whilst Solid Snake is being held between torture sessions with Revolver Ocelot while suffering from a cold and diarrhea. Johnny's character is never named in the game and is listed only in the ending credits as Johnny Sasaki. The surname Sasaki comes from the game's character model designer Hideki Sasaki. According to the developers' commentary in Metal Gear Solid: Integral, Hideki was known among the staff for his slackoff behavior and the character was included in the game as a running gag.

Johnny later returns for a pair of voice-over only cameos in Metal Gear Solid 2. In an early version of the game's story, his full name was to be  and originally had a minor role in the story in which his character (a spy for the Patriots) would die from a pacemaker malfunction after coming in contact with Raiden. During the game, Raiden can hear Johnny talking using a directional mic in Big Shell.

In the game of Metal Gear Solid 4, Johnny now has the nickname  and is a member of Meryl's Rat Patrol Team 01. Also, his face is revealed for the first time in the series. He and Meryl assist Snake in Outer Haven by allowing him time to reach the server room. It is revealed that he had been in love with Meryl since he first saw her at Shadow Moses, and they get married in the epilogue. Unlike all of the other soldiers in the Army and the PMCs, Johnny does not have nanomachines since he always avoided the injections due to his trypanophobia; the lack of these explains his frequent spells of colds and diarrhea. While this gives him poor combat performance in comparison to his squad mates, he is completely immune to Liquid Ocelot's ability to directly attack soldiers' nanomachines. He also appears in the first Metal Gear Online expansion as a playable character.

Johnny Sasaki is voiced by Naoki Imamura in the Japanese version and by Dean Scofield in the English translation. Akiba is voiced by Jun Fukuyama in Japanese and by Beng Spies in English.

Donald Anderson
 is a chief advisor associated with DARPA. 
In Metal Gear Solid, he is tortured for information by the rogue FOXHOUND members, but is killed by Revolver Ocelot, and impersonated by Decoy Octopus, and later Olga Gurlukovich in Metal Gear Solid 2. Anderson is implied in Peace Walker and Metal Gear Solid V to have contributed Cipher's technology and later oversees the AI proxies that would control governments and military. Donald Anderson is voiced by Keiji Fujiwara for the Japanese version and by Greg Eagles for the English translation. The younger version is voiced by James C. Mathis III for the English translation.

Sons of Big Boss
The Sons of Big Boss are a splinter group of FOXHOUND seen in Metal Gear Solid led by Liquid Snake as the game's bosses.

Psycho Mantis
 is a psychic expert for Liquid Snake's FOXHOUND unit in Metal Gear Solid. After the collapse of the Soviet Union, he came to America looking for a job. Prior to joining FOXHOUND, he worked with the KGB and the FBI. His special abilities include the psychic powers of psychokinesis and telepathy, which in a Fourth Wall-breaking scene allows him to identify certain games on the player's memory card and "move" the controller by making it vibrate. As a result of being disgusted with his father's inner thoughts, he burned his own village and started despising people. He also claims to be able to read the future, but this is implied to be a use of telepathy to find out what his opponents will do next as opposed to true clairvoyance. Mantis encounters Solid Snake twice, the first time he takes control of Meryl Silverburgh's mind, the second encounter he and Snake do battle, with Mantis being killed (due to him being unable to predict Snake's actions when the player uses the second controller port). His predictions also seem to be susceptible to change, stating that Snake has a large place in Meryl's heart, but cannot see if their futures lie together. In Metal Gear Solid 4, the original Mantis makes an appearance after Screaming Mantis's defeat, attempting to "read your mind" as before, but cannot due to the advanced systems. He then tries to manipulate the controller, which (depending on whether controller vibration is available) either fails and infuriates him or succeeds and makes him scream in delight before he vanishes into the air. Drebin later reveals that the Beauty and the Beast Corps had been under the control of Mantis all along.

The character's first chronological appearance is in Metal Gear Solid V: The Phantom Pain, where he is known as  The character's origin story explains that he was identified by Soviet researchers and taken to a facility in Moscow where he was housed with the comatose Volgin. Responding to Volgin's innate overriding desire for revenge, the two broke out, with Volgin as the Man on Fire. The boy and the Man on Fire pursue Venom Snake throughout the story, working alongside Skull Face, the game's antagonist. The boy is able to detect the subtle electromagnetic currents running between the brain's synapses, and is particularly sensitive to feelings of anger, hatred and the desire for revenge. These feelings manifest in the physical world as a representation of those emotions. However, since he is still a child, he is overwhelmed by these emotions and becomes a slave to the will of whoever is expressing them. Over the story's course, he identifies these feelings as being strongest in White Mamba and their relationship becomes symbiotic, magnifying the boy's power even further and allowing White Mamba to take control of Metal Gear Sahelanthropus. Once Snake disables Sahelanthropus, the boy steals a sample of a weaponized parasite designed to target English language speakers and passes it on to White Mamba and the two disappear.

Psycho Mantis was polled as the 8th "Greatest Video Game Villain of All Time" by IGN and his boss battle being the 2nd Greatest Moment in Gaming. In the Japanese version, Psycho Mantis has been voiced by Kazuyuki Sogabe, Hiroshi Yanaka and Shōzō Iizuka. Psycho Mantis is voiced by Doug Stone in the English translation.

Sniper Wolf

 is an Iraqi-Kurdish sharpshooter of the FOXHOUND unit in Metal Gear Solid. She uses a Heckler & Koch PSG1. Though snipers usually work in pairs, Wolf works alone. She is also another "disciple" of Big Boss whom she sees as a modern-day version of the Kurdish sultan Saladin. During Liquid Snake's takeover, she allows Otacon to feed the wolves and gives him a handkerchief; Otacon becomes infatuated with her because of this. She fights Solid Snake twice, the first time results in Meryl being captured, Wolf with mild blood loss, and Snake being tortured, the second battle results in her being killed. Sniper Wolf is voiced by Naoko Nakamura in the Japanese version and by Tasia Valenza in the English translation.

Vulcan Raven
 is an Inuit member of FOXHOUND who wields a giant Vulcan cannon and has shamanic powers of intuition seen in Metal Gear Solid. He is able to discern Solid Snake's heritage and was present in Outer Heaven prior to his involvement at Liquid Snake's FOXHOUND unit. He does battle with Snake twice, the first battle with Raven in an M1 Abrams tank, the second in a freezer with Raven being killed but also leaves with a cryptic message of Snake's violent future before his body is completely devoured by ravens. Vulcan Raven is voiced by Yukitoshi Hori in the Japanese version and by Peter Lurie in the English translation.

Decoy Octopus
 is a member of FOXHOUND specializing in impersonation seen in Metal Gear Solid. He even injects the blood of those he impersonates into his own body for a more "perfect" disguise. Along with the rest of his unit, he went rogue during Liquid Snake's Shadow Moses island incident. While impersonating Donald Anderson, he lies to Solid Snake about having the DARPA chief's detonation code found out by Psycho Mantis and also informs Snake of the PAL override system before being killed by the FoxDie virus. Decoy Octopus is voiced by Masaharu Sato in the Japanese version. In the English translation, Decoy Octopus is voiced by Greg Eagles (originally) and by James C. Mathis III (subsequently).

Liquid Snake

, real name , is Solid Snake's twin brother, Big Boss's second clone, and the main antagonist of Metal Gear Solid. One of Liquid's motivations in Metal Gear Solid is his jealousy and hatred towards Snake and his desire to surpass his "genetic destiny" from Big Boss. The character's young iteration is one of the main antagonists of Metal Gear Solid V: The Phantom Pain under the nickname . Liquid Snake is voiced by Banjō Ginga in the Japanese version and by Cam Clarke in the English translation. White Mamba is voiced by Yutaro Honjo in Japanese and by Piers Stubbs in English.

Nastasha Romanenko
 is an agent of the U.S. Defense Intelligence Agency and an expert on nuclear topics. She was born in the Ukrainian SSR and was just ten years old when the Chernobyl disaster took place. In both Metal Gear Solid and its GameCube remake Metal Gear Solid: The Twin Snakes, she is Solid Snake's contact on matters related to nuclear weapons. After the game's events, her character writes an autobiography titled In the Darkness of Shadow Moses: The Unofficial Truth and then forms the anti-proliferation group "Philanthropy" with the profits she made. This fictional publication serves as a plot summary of Metal Gear Solid (and reveals previously undisclosed plot details about the game's events), and is included as a bonus feature in Metal Gear Solid 2. Nastasha Romanenko is voiced by Eiko Yamada in the Japanese version and by Renee Raudman in the English translation.

Kenneth Baker
 is the president of the arms industry company ArmsTech that takes part in Metal Gear REX's project with the DARPA chief Donald Anderson as part of the United States' black budget. In Metal Gear Solid, he is taken prisoner by FOXHOUND, and tortured by Revolver Ocelot then rescued by Solid Snake. After he gives away his detonation code to Ocelot, Snake is unable to rescue him before as he is killed by the FoxDie virus; he is the first person to realize what's really happening and nearly tells the truth about Snake's mission but dies before he can finish his sentence. Kenneth Baker is voiced by Yuzuru Fujimoto in the Japanese version. In the English translation, Kenneth Baker is voiced by Allan Lurie (originally) and by Peter Renaday (subsequently).

Jim Houseman
 is the United States Secretary of Defense who observes the situation on Shadow Moses Island during Metal Gear Solid aboard an AWACS command plane. He makes only one appearance at the game's end via CODEC where he orders the Shadow Moses base to be bombed, partially out of spite because of the DARPA chief. According to In the Darkness of Shadow Moses, he commits suicide following the events of the game but Nastasha Romanenko suggests he was murdered. Jim Houseman is voiced by Tomohisa Asō in the Japanese version and William Bassett in the English translation.

Introduced in Metal Gear Solid 2: Sons of Liberty

Raiden

, real name , is a former child soldier during the Liberian Civil War. He is the main character of Metal Gear Solid 2: Sons of Liberty that substitutes Solid Snake as the player character in the game's main portion fighting against Solidus Snake's terrorists to save the hostages from Big Shell. Raiden reappears in Metal Gear Solid 4: Guns of the Patriots as a new version of Cyborg Ninja as support, and returns as the protagonist of Metal Gear Rising: Revengeance. Raiden is voiced by Kenyu Horiuchi in the Japanese version and by Quinton Flynn in the English translation.

Rosemary
, or simply  for short, is Raiden's girlfriend.

Introduced during the Plant chapter portion of Metal Gear Solid 2, she is employed by the army as a data analyst, and saves the player's progress over Codec. Rosemary also supports Raiden by providing information about the Big Shell facilities and the other characters Raiden encounters in the game. Raiden and Rose spend most of their conversations talking about their relationship, something based on Kojima's real life. By the end of the game, Rosemary reveals herself to be a spy for the Patriots. She is then taken off the mission and replaced by an A.I. duplicate of her who openly mocks Raiden. After the final battle, Raiden is reunited with the real Rose, pregnant with his child, in front of Federal Hall National Memorial.

In Metal Gear Solid 4, Rosemary appears as a psychological counselor in a combat stress platoon, offering Old Snake tips on dealing with stress. Though she was engaged to Raiden, their relationship ended after Rosemary supposedly had a miscarriage. Rosemary later marries Roy Campbell. In reality, Rosemary did give birth to Raiden's child John and her marriage is a ploy to protect the boy from the Patriots by having Campbell pose as John's father. After she reveals the truth to Raiden, the couple reconciles.

Rosemary does not appear in Metal Gear Rising: Revengence, but Raiden mentions that she along with their son are living in New Zealand.

Rosemary is voiced by Kikuko Inoue in the Japanese version. In the English translation, Rosemary is voiced by Lara Cody (originally) and by Kari Wahlgren (subsequently).

Olga Gurlukovich
 is a member of her father's mercenary unit during Metal Gear Solid 2. Her character was somewhat based on Meryl Silverburgh yet Kojima wanted to make her look like a professional rather than a rookie. She first appears in the Tanker chapter as a member of the Gurlukovich mercenary unit and is the sole boss character in this portion of the game. She takes over her father's unit after her father's death in the Tanker chapter, lending her team to Solidus Snake's Sons of Liberty terrorist faction. She is actually an unwilling agent for the Patriots who are holding her daughter hostage, and assists Raiden as Mr. X (a second version of Cyborg Ninja), simulating Gray Fox during Metal Gear Solid. By doing so, she betrays her comrades to ensure her child's safety, a realization that makes her feel guilty. She is shot and killed by Solidus. In the Japanese version, Olga Gurlukovich is voiced by Kyoko Terase and Mr. X is voiced by Masaharu Sato, and Takumi Yamazaki. In the English translation, Olga Gurlukovich is voiced by Vanessa Marshall and Mr. X is voiced by Larc Spies.

Dead Cell
Dead Cell is a black-ops unit introduced in Metal Gear Solid 2 as the game's bosses. Formed by Solidus Snake, Dead Cell's original purpose was to prepare military bases for surprise attacks by holding unannounced training sessions.

Vamp
 is a member of Dead Cell from Romania. He is a knife-throwing specialist endowed with numerous vampire-like abilities and attributes, such as a taste for blood, superhuman strength, speed, agility, the ability to walk on vertical walls and run across water (although this was based on a character that was scrapped). His moniker has dual meanings, being a short form of the English word vampire as well as referring to his bisexual orientation. Vamp was originally designed as a woman, but when the character of Fortune was introduced, the design was changed to that of a man, although the long black hair was retained, with the finished model being based on dancer Joaquín Cortés. First appearing in Metal Gear Solid 2, he was part of Solidus Snake's "Sons of Liberty" terrorist group during the Plant chapter. Vamp confronts Raiden several times throughout the course of the game being seemingly killed, but still manages to survive. In Metal Gear Solid 4, Vamp appears as a member of Liquid Ocelot's private army and as Raiden's rival. His "immortality" is revealed to be caused by nanomachines in his body that heal all of his wounds at an extraordinarily fast rate (augmenting his natural healing abilities). After Naomi Hunter designs a syringe used to destabilize the functionality of nanomachines, a wounded Vamp uses it to end his suffering. Vamp was also added to the second expansion of Metal Gear Online as a playable character. In the Japanese version, Vamp has been voiced by Ryotaro Okiayu (originally) and by Shinya Tsukamoto (subsequently). Vamp is voiced by Phil LaMarr in the English translation.

Fortune 
, real name , is the leading member of Dead Cell and a member of Solidus Snake's "Sons of Liberty" terrorist group seen in Metal Gear Solid 2. She is an African-American woman with blond hair, something requested by Shinkawa as he thought she would be appealing. Her weapon is a railgun. Her codename comes from her nearly-miraculous ability to have bullets pass by her without hitting her. Fortune confronts Raiden as the first boss character in the Plant chapter, though she cannot actually be defeated due to her powers. The fight ends when Vamp arrives and is seemingly killed by Raiden, which makes her temporarily lose her will to fight until Vamp revives. Her true motive is to seek revenge against Solid Snake whom she believes was responsible for her father's death. Near the end of the game, she learns it was actually Revolver Ocelot who killed her father, and Ocelot reveals that her immunity to bullets was simply the result of an electromagnetic force field surrounding her body, which he deactivates before shooting her. However, Fortune manages to psychically deflect Ocelot's attacks from Metal Gear RAY before dying, with Snake hinting that her power as "Lady Luck" was not completely fake. Fortune is voiced by Yumi Tōma in the Japanese version and by Maula Gale in the English translation.

Fatman
 is a member of Solidus Snake's Dead Cell unit seen in Metal Gear Solid 2 that specializes in explosives. He is a psychopathic, overweight bald man in an EOD suit who moves around on rollerblades and is armed with a Glock 18 in addition to his bombs. Shinkawa had trouble designing him as he had been requested to make him obese and goodlooking at the same time. He is the second boss character in the Plant chapter. One of Raiden's early objectives in the Plant chapter is to deactivate a series of C4 bombs planted within each of the struts surrounding the Shell 1 core. The explosives are revealed to be nothing more than dummy bombs serving to activate the real bomb in the basement of Strut A. A similar bomb planted in the basement of the Shell 2 Core detonates, killing Fatman's former mentor Peter Stillman in the process. As Raiden meets with him, Fatman reveals that he wishes to become the world's most famous bomber by surpassing Stillman. Fatman then challenges Raiden to a duel at the heliport atop Strut E, which results in his death. It's later revealed that Fatman was actually an agent of The Patriots and that Stillman's presence in the facility was arranged to motivate Fatman into participating. He is named after the bomb dropped on Nagasaki, Japan on August 9, 1945. Fatman was voiced by Kōzō Shioya in the Japanese version and by Barry Dennen in the English translation.

Solidus Snake
After being alluded as the President of the United States in Metal Gear Solid, he makes his first official appearance as the main antagonist in Metal Gear Solid 2: Sons of Liberty, with a design based on Yoji Shinkawa's thoughts regarding how his brother Solid Snake would look when older, as well as being the adoptive father of Raiden. During Sons of Liberty, Solidus turned against the Patriots and posed as Snake while instigating a terrorist takeover of the Big Shell with Revolver Ocelot and Olga Gurlukovich in order to form his own nation to leave his impact on the world. For combat, Solidus wears a powered suit outfitted with a pair of tentacle-like mechanisms known as "snake arms". Solidus tries to kill Raiden to use his foster son's nanomachines to lead him to the Patriots. However, Raiden severely injures Solidus in their duel atop Federal Hall National Memorial, slicing into the spine of Solidus's powered exoskeleton with a high frequency blade, and Solidus falls off the building and seemingly dies from his injuries. In Metal Gear Solid 4, Solidus's brain-dead body is used for Big Boss's reconstruction and as a decoy which used by Liquid Ocelot to hack into the Patriots' AI.

In 2012, GamesRadar featured both him and Liquid Snake in the second place on the list of most evil clones in gaming, commenting that "as evil clones go, the ones that threaten the world with thermonuclear war and eradication rank as some of the worst." Solidus Snake was voiced by Akio Ōtsuka in the Japanese version and by John Cygan in the English translation.

Sergei Gurlukovich
Colonel  is Olga Gurlukovich's father and Revolver Ocelot's former commanding officer. Gurlukovich was also the one who provided a Hind-D helicopter to Liquid Snake in Metal Gear Solid with a possible usage of Metal Gear REX. An officer in Russia's Spetsnaz and GRU, he leads his personal team of mercenaries to seize the Discovery during the Tanker chapter of Metal Gear Solid 2 for the purpose of hijacking Metal Gear RAY. In the course of the operation, Gurlukovich is betrayed and killed by Ocelot due to the Patriots wanting RAY for their cause. Sergei Gurlukovich is voiced by Osamu Saka in the Japanese version and by Earl Boen in the English translation.

Scott Dolph
General  is the commandant of the Marine Corps and Fortune's father. In the Tanker chapter of Metal Gear Solid 2, he is in charge of transporting Metal Gear RAY to its testing site and gives a speech to his troops in the cargo holds, unaware that the ship is being hijacked. He is killed by Revolver Ocelot before hijacking RAY, and his death serves as the root of Fortune's sorrow. Scott Dolph is voiced by Daisuke Gori in the Japanese version. In the English translation, Scott Dolph is voiced by Kevin Michael Richardson (originally) and by Phil LaMarr (subsequently).

Peter Stillman
 is a former NYPD bomb disposal expert working for the Bund Patrol and the former mentor of Fatman, having taught him everything he knows about explosives. In Metal Gear Solid 2, he infiltrates the Big Shell facility with SEAL Team 10. After Fatman planted bombs within each of the struts in the entire Big Shell facility, Stillman provides Raiden and Iroquois Pliskin with the tools needed to track down and deactivate each of the explosives, while providing support to the player via the codec. He eventually learns that the explosives Fatman planted were decoys used to activate the real bombs set to destroy the foundation of Shell 1 and Shell 2. Stillman races to the basement of Strut H, only to be caught in Fatman's trap: the bomb being equipped with a proximity sensor, detonates, killing Stillman. His character was most likely named after a character in Paul Auster's New York Trilogy. Peter Stillman is voiced by Shōzō Iizuka in the Japanese version. In the English translation, Peter Stillman has been voiced by Greg Eagles (originally) and by James C. Mathis III (subsequently).

Richard Ames
Colonel  is a Secret Service agent and an operative for the Patriots. He previously served the Defense Intelligence Agency where he met Nastasha Romanenko. He was married to Nastasha for a while, but the two ended up divorcing. He was taken hostage during the Big Shell incident. In Metal Gear Solid 2, he met Raiden and then threatened by Revolver Ocelot, and then suddenly dies from an apparent heart attack. It is later revealed that he died from his nanomachines turning off his pacemaker thanks to a virus imitating FOXDIE put in place by the Patriots. Richard Ames is voiced by Masaharu Satō in the Japanese version and by Peter Renaday in the English translation.

James Johnson
 is the President of the United States during the events of Sons of Liberty. He is the primary hostage Raiden is sent to rescue in the Plant chapter. After a series of ordeals, Raiden finally meets the President in the Shell 2 Core. The President reveals that he was actually a willing accomplice in the terrorist act, his vital signs being the input codes to activate Arsenal Gear (the new version of Metal Gear housed in Big Shell), but was imprisoned after a conflict of interest with Solidus Snake as Johnson wanted power whereas his predecessor preferred rebelling altogether. After he reveals the truth about Arsenal Gear to Raiden, he learns that he was manipulated to revolt by the Patriots as part of the S3 Plan. He is then killed by Revolver Ocelot while arguing with Raiden to kill him to prevent the terrorists from launching a nuclear strike. James Johnson is voiced by Yuzuru Fujimoto in the Japanese version. In the English translation, James Johnson is voiced by Paul Lukather (originally) and by H. Richard Greene (subsequently).

Emma Emmerich
, nicknamed E.E., is an AI programmer and the stepsister of Hal Emmerich. When Emma was a child, her mother Julie Danziger married Huey Emmerich. Emma and Hal became very close as children and often swam together. When Hal was an adolescent, he was seduced by Emma's mother. Upon learning this, Huey committed suicide by drowning in the family's swimming pool and accidentally dragged Emma into the water in the process. She survived, but not without injury. Emma expected Hal to save her, but Hal was not aware that this was happening. After this, Emma developed a fear of water and became estranged from her stepbrother, blaming Hal for leaving the family afterwards. During the Plant chapter of Metal Gear Solid 2: Sons of Liberty, she is in charge of developing the AI that controls Arsenal Gear. She is escorted to the Shell 1 Core computer room by Raiden to download a virus into AI GW so that it will not be used by the terrorists, but is ambushed by Vamp on the oil fence. Raiden snipes Vamp, but before falling into the sea, Vamp fatally stabs Emma in the stomach. She later dies in the computer room confessing how she wanted to be closer to her stepbrother. Emma Emmerich is voiced by Maria Yamamoto in the Japanese version and by Jennifer Hale in the English translation.

Introduced in Metal Gear Solid 3: Snake Eater

Naked Snake

, real name , is the main protagonist of the Metal Gear Solid prequel series. The character's past is explored in Metal Gear Solid 3: Snake Eater as a member of FOX special forces. After defeating his legendary war hero mentor, Snake establishes FOXHOUND in Metal Gear Solid: Portable Ops and Militaires Sans Frontières in Metal Gear Solid: Peace Walker, and serves as Venom Snake's mental template in Metal Gear Solid V: The Phantom Pain. Naked Snake is voiced by Akio Ōtsuka in the Japanese version. In the English translation, Naked Snake is voiced by David Hayter (originally) and by Kiefer Sutherland (subsequently). Big Boss in Metal Gear Solid 4: Guns of the Patriots has been voiced by Chikao Ōtsuka in Japanese and by Richard Doyle in English.

Zero
, real name , also known as Major Zero and Major Tom, is the true main antagonist of the entire Metal Gear series. Introduced in Metal Gear Solid 3, he is a former member of the British Special Air Service who serves as commanding officer of the FOX unit that communicates with Naked Snake via radio. In Portable Ops, Zero is arrested by the Pentagon for the FOX unit's revolt but is exonerated afterwards. Peace Walker revealed Zero as leader of the Cipher organization that controls the United States. Metal Gear Solid 4 revealed Zero's fallout with Big Boss over the "Les Enfants Terribles" project eventually caused his control over the world via AIs that would be the Patriots, and personally appears as a centennial in a persistent vegetative state (due to Skull Face's parasite in Metal Gear Solid V) to which Big Boss cuts off his oxygen supply and places him in a chokehold to facilitate his death. Zero is voiced by Banjō Ginga in the Japanese version. In the English translation, Zero is voiced by Jim Piddock (originally) and by Time Winters (subsequently).

Sokolov
Dr.  is a rocket scientist seen in Metal Gear Solid 3. Despite being cowardly and timid, he was able to defect to the United States two years before the events of the game, but was sent back to the USSR as a secret addition to the negotiations for ending the Cuban Missile Crisis. He develops the Shagohod. In the midsts of Naked Snake's retrieval of Sokolov, Colonel Volgin captures him and forces him to complete the weapon, and later seemingly dies of torture off-screen for trying to escape. Despite his apparent death, Sokolov returns in Portable Ops as the informant . After he survived and escaped to the US with the help of FOX's new commander Gene, he builds the first Metal Gear model, a quadrupedal model, but still assists Big Boss as a result of the danger RAXA can make. He can also be recruited into the early FOXHOUND team. Nikolai Sokolov is voiced by Naoki Tatsuta in the Japanese version and by Brian Cummings in the English translation.

The Boss

The Boss is voiced by Kikuko Inoue in the Japanese version and by Lori Alan in the English translation.

Volgin
, better known as "Thunderbolt" in the West, is a Stalinist GRU colonel and the main  antagonist of Metal Gear Solid 3: Snake Eater. His body carries an electric charge of ten million volts (speculated by Soviet scientists to be the result of Electrokinesis) that he uses chiefly for fighting and  torture. A sadistic brute of a man, Volgin delights in causing wanton destruction and inflicting pain on anyone who crosses his path. He is also revealed to have been one of the chief perpetrators behind the 1940 Katyn Forest Massacre.

During the events of Snake Eater, Volgin conspires to use the Shagohod as part of a bid to seize control of the Soviet Union by deposing Nikita Khrushchev and installing Leonid Brezhnev in his place. In the story's climax, he pilots Shagohod and engages Naked Snake and EVA in a fight to the death. After being critically wounded, it begins raining and he is struck by a bolt of lightning which leaves him comatose and near death. His appearance enables him to convert the energy from firearms and explosive rounds into powerful attacks. However, he eventually dies in peace in a final confrontation, where it is implied that he deduced Venom Snake is not the target of his vendetta.

Volgin is voiced by Kenji Utsumi in the Japanese version and by Neil Ross in the English version. The Man in Fire is voiced by Dave Fouquette in English.

EVA

EVA is voiced by Misa Watanabe in the Japanese version. In the English translation, EVA is voiced by Suzetta Miñet (primarily) and by Vanessa Marshall (briefly). Big Mama is voiced by Mari Natsuki in Japanese and by Lee Meriwether in English.

Para-Medic
Although it is set before the modern use of the word "paramedic", her codename instead comes from a portmanteau of "parachute" and "medic". Para-Medic provides Naked Snake with information in Metal Gear Solid 3 (surgical information, general information on the local flora and fauna, and being an avid movie-watcher who enjoys discussing her favorite films (despite Snake's disinterest)), and can later be recruited into the early FOXHOUND team in Portable Ops. Later games revealed that Para-Medic was the head of Zero's "Les Enfants Terribles" project, and was the one responsible for Gray Fox's revival and was in-turn murdered by the Cyborg Ninja. Originally, many people believed that Dr. Clark was a man, which is later explained as due to being so secretive that nobody knows anything about her, including the fact that she was actually a woman. Para-Medic is voiced by Houko Kuwashima in the Japanese version and by Heather Halley in the English translation.

Cobra Unit

The Cobra Unit is The Boss's personal team of military specialists and the bosses of Metal Gear Solid 3. Each member is named after the emotion that they bring into battle.

The Pain
 has the ability to control hornets at his will, through the buzzing of a queen hornet that he keeps in his backpack. Apart from his hornets, The Pain is also equipped with a Tommy gun and grenades, using his hornets in conjunction with these weapons. He also uses his hornets to shield himself and create the form of a body double to confuse and draw his opponents into the open. In Metal Gear Solid 3, he fought and was defeated by Naked Snake. The Pain is voiced by Hisao Egawa in the Japanese version and by Gregg Berger in the English translation.

The Fear
 is a member of the Cobra unit known for his superhuman speed and agility, as well as his freakish, fearsome appearance. Capable of dislocating his joints at will, he is able to crawl, walk on water, flip, leap extremely quickly in the manner of a spider, and also climb and jump around in trees with ease. He uses two crossbows in battle, the Little Joe and the William Tell, coating his bolts in the venom of the Brazilian wandering spider, setting them on fire or even outfitting them with explosives. He uses a variety of wires and ropes to enhance his mobility. On top of his incredible agility, he also uses Stealth camouflage to make himself nearly invisible. At the beginning of the battle in Metal Gear Solid 3, he shoots Naked Snake in the leg with a poisoned crossbow bolt, but wants to kill Snake himself rather than let the venom do the job for him. The poison begins to make Snake hallucinate, giving The Fear a distinct advantage, though Snake still manages to defeat him. The Fear is voiced by Kazumi Tanaka in the Japanese version and by Michael Bell in the English translation.

The End
 is a member of the Cobra unit with exceptional sniping skills, born in the early 1860s, and the only member of the unit without an emotion-based codename, though it is explained in the game that it signifies "true oblivion". The End is a venerable expert sniper, but is visibly vulnerable as a result of his age. However, he is capable of photosynthesizing sunlight to sustain his life and go for days without food or water, later explained in The Phantom Pain as the effect of a species of parasite that lives in his body. He has a pet parrot (an Alexandrine parakeet) who can alert him to Snake's presence. The End is the only member of the Cobras who will not kill the player under any circumstances; he only uses tranquilizing rounds and will throw Snake in a jailcell when he is defeated. The strategic sniper fight between Naked Snake and The End in Metal Gear Solid 3 was developed by Kojima who wanted to bring a completely new style of boss battle to the series. However, the fight can be avoided if Snake kills a defenseless The End shortly before, or if the player saves during the fight and waits a week (or sets the system clock a week ahead), in which case The End dies of old age. In Peace Walker, The End's voice can sometimes be heard over the Codec during ghost missions, and Snake comments numerous times during mission briefings asking Kaz Miller if he saw any parrots with the enemy snipers and scouts. The End is voiced by Osamu Saka in the Japanese version and by J. Grant Albrecht in the English translation.

The Fury
 is a pyromaniac and former Soviet cosmonaut. He utilizes a flame-resistant Soviet space suit in conjunction with a jet pack and a powerful flamethrower, both of which are powered by liquid rocket fuel UDMH. His codename reflects the unmitigated fury he feels towards the world while he is fighting. In Metal Gear Solid 3, he fought and is defeated by Naked Snake. The Fury is voiced by Masato Hirano in the Japanese version and by Richard Doyle in the English translation.

The Sorrow
 was a powerful spirit medium and a former member of the Cobra unit, who used his psychic powers to aid his fellow soldiers on the battlefield. After being romantically involved with The Boss, he was the father of her child. After the ideological rift created by the Cold War, loyalties changed with him and The Boss each taking their respective sides. The Boss kills him in 1962 for making a double agent out of a sleeper agent she sent to OKB-1 to gather data on the USSR's space program. He makes many hidden appearances in ghost form throughout the game's cut scenes. In Metal Gear Solid 3, after escaping from Groznyj Grad and suffering a near-death experience, Naked Snake encounters The Sorrow while being forced to wade through an endless river swarming with all of the enemies that Snake has killed up to that point. The Sorrow is voiced by Yukitoshi Hori in the Japanese version and by David Thomas in the English translation.

Raikov
 is a high-ranking officer within Groznyj Grad. He is implied to be Colonel Volgin's secret lover, and consequently has colonel-class authority despite only having a rank of major. The character is a parody of Raiden. The player is also able to wear a mask to impersonate him as Kojima noted that there were fans who wanted to play as Raiden in Metal Gear Solid 3. Besides impersonating Raikov, Naked Snake also has to knock him out to take his uniform and go to Groznyj Grad with the player also being given the choice of killing him. According to Kojima, the reason why he left Raikov's fate up to the player was largely because of Raiden's controversial popularity, where he'd allow the player, depending on whether their views of Raiden were positive or negative, to spare or kill Raikov, respectively. Raikov appears as a secret character in Portable Ops as being exiled to Colombia by the Soviet military after the fallout of Operation Snake Eater runs him afoul of the Kremlin. Raikov is voiced by Ken'yû Horiuchi in the Japanese version and by Charlie Schlatter in the English translation.

Aleksandr Granin
 is the director of OKB-812 (also known as the Granin Design Bureau). He is the man who originally came up with the concept of bipedal walking tanks (the blueprints for Metal Gear REX and Metal Gear D). He supplies Naked Snake with the key to the door near the warehouse, but dies under Volgin's torture. Aleksandr Granin is voiced by Takeshi Aono in the Japanese version and by Jim Ward in the English translation.

Johnny
Johnny is a GRU soldier seen in Snake Eater. He is assigned to watch over Naked Snake's jail cell in Groznyj Grad after Snake is captured by Volgin. He wears the standard uniform all the GRU soldiers wear in the game, except his balaclava is adorned with a large letter "J" on its forehead. Due to having an estranged son with the same name in America and claiming that all the first-born sons in his family are given that name, he is implied to be the grandfather of Johnny Sasaki. Johnny is voiced by Naoki Imamura in the Japanese version and by Michael Gough in the English translation.

CIA Director
The Director of Central Intelligence is a minor character who appears at the end of Metal Gear Solid 3: Snake Eater. The DCI resembles John McCone (the actual DCI in 1964), but is written as an unnamed fictionalized counterpart. He was the one who planned out the Operation Snake Eater, and as a result Naked Snake refuses to shake his hand during the award ceremony after returning from the mission. He was also the one who employed Ocelot (aka ADAM) as a triple agent within the CIA, KGB and GRU. In the end of Metal Gear Solid: Portable Ops, Ocelot ends up betraying the DCI under orders from a new employer and kills him in order to obtain the location of the Philosopher's Legacy. In the Japanese version, the DCI is voiced by an uncredited actor (in Metal Gear Solid 3) and by Masaharu Sato (in Portable Ops). In the English translation, the DCI is voiced by Paul Collins (in Metal Gear Solid 3) and by Jesse Corti (in Portable Ops).

DOD Official
The DOD Official appears at the end of Metal Gear Solid 3: Snake Eater, where he briefly talks to the DCI during Big Boss's award ceremony. He bears the likeness of Robert McNamara (the actual Secretary of Defense in 1964), although the character was later rewritten to be the Army Chief of Staff in Metal Gear Solid: Peace Walker. He makes an unvoiced appearance in the end of Metal Gear Solid: Portable Ops, where he can be seen standing next to Major Zero during FOXHOUND's inauguration ceremony. In Peace Walker, the character, who is now the Chairman of the Joint Chiefs of Staff, gets in touch with Big Boss when Peace Walker launches false nuclear launch data. He is the only member at the DEFCON meeting who believes Big Boss when told that the nuclear launch data is false after the latter provides proof, but is held at gunpoint by the other executive members when he orders them to stand down from retaliating. Big Boss ultimately succeeds, however, in stopping the false data from being sent.

Introduced in Metal Gear Solid: Portable Ops

Jonathan
 is one of the Red Army soldiers stationed at the San Hieronymo base. He is the first of the enemy soldiers to be recruited by Naked Snake's early FOXHOUND group. After meeting Snake and Roy Campbell, Jonathan says the Red Army personnel were assigned to build the base as an alternate strategic missile site after the Cuban Missile Crisis; detente and the USSR's commitment to the SALT negotiations resulted in the abandonment of the base, triggering the soldiers' decision to join Gene. Jonathan is left impressed with Snake's idealism and also helps in treating Campbell's bout with malaria. As Gene manipulates the Soviet soldiers into killing each other later in the game, Jonathan takes a few rounds meant for Snake and dies in Snake's arms, leading Snake to scream out in sorrow and rage. Jonathan's death comes to traumatize Snake deeply, further shaping the ideals and principles that Snake comes to uphold as Big Boss. Jonathan is voiced by Takahiro Fujimoto in Japanese and by Robin Atkin Downes in English.

Colonel Skowronski
Skowronski is a commander of the Red Army base in San Hieronymo. A World War II veteran and former fighter pilot, Naked Snake finds him hiding aboard a ship in the harbor that housed his fighter plane collection. It is revealed that the colonel had been drinking after Gene's men took over the base and even turned the Red Army troops against him. Skowronski dies in an attempt to kill Gene using RAXA. When it shuts down, Ursula telekinetically picks him off the cockpit and drops him to his death. Colonel Skowronski is voiced by Tetsu Inada in Japanese and by Nick Jameson in English.

Python
 is one of FOX's original members revealed to have worked alongside Naked Snake during the early stages of the US advisory effort in Vietnam. However, he was severely injured during a mission with the Civilian Irregular Defense Group that he lost the ability to regulate his body temperature. The US government operated on him to stabilize his body temperature, eventually putting him in a Sneaking Suit filled with liquid nitrogen and several needles on his head to vent the excess heat. The CIA uses him as a counterpart to Snake in case he rebelled. Python joins the player's pool if he is defeated by nonlethal means, but will burn to death if he is killed. Python is voiced by Yûsaku Yara in Japanese and by Dwight Schultz in English.

Elisa and Ursula
 and Ursula are split personalities of a teenage girl raised in East Germany to nuclear physicists who worked in the USSR. She is revealed to be a survivor of the 1957 Kyshtym disaster; the radioactive fallout triggered her psychic abilities. The girl went back to East Germany and underwent numerous ESP and psychic tests. The testing enabled the girl to create split personalities that people can mistake them as twins due to their different hair colors (Elisa has gold hair, where Ursula's hair is silver). Gene rescued her during a mission in 1966 and later trained her personas – Elisa in medicine and Ursula in combat abilities. Over the course of the game, Elisa helps Naked Snake. However, the Ursula personality kicks in during Snake's showdown with Metal Gear RAXA. The combined personalities attempt to stop Gene, 'she' is killed. Her last words to Snake cryptically point to important developments in later games. Elisa/Ursula is voiced by Saori Gotō in Japanese and by Tara Strong in English.

Cunningham
Lt. Cunningham is an African-American soldier and FOX's resident interrogation specialist that goes by the codename Boa. After losing his leg due to unspecified reasons and getting demoted to desk work by the CIA, the Department of Defense taps him to besmirch the CIA's reputation, a job he accepted due to desiring revenge for his demotion. This enables him to join Gene's revolt and later to interrogate Naked Snake about the Philosophers' Legacy. Snake defeats him upon learning of the DOD's plans, with his flying platform exploding shortly thereafter, although not before he attempts to destroy the base with a Davy Crockett round in an attempt to ensure Snake died with him. Cunningham is voiced by Daisuke Gori in Japanese and by Noah Nelson in English.

Gene
Gene is the commander of FOX and the main antagonist of Metal Gear Solid: Portable Ops. Having joined the unit under the codename Viper, he proves his worth by rescuing Sokolov and Elisa during missions to Eastern Europe. A doctor by trade with a moderate degree of political science knowledge, he gradually undermines Major Zero's authority and prepares his own rebellion. Gene participates in the Successor Project, a special program designed to create a military officer modeled after The Boss and highly educated in military strategy and tactics. The program results in Gene developing enhanced CQC abilities and powers of persuasion/mild telepathic powers. Naked Snake kills him after Gene reveals his plans behind the takeover of the San Hieronymo base. Recognizing Snake's combat skills, Gene bequeaths to Snake all the resources he had amassed for the military force Army's Heaven. Gene is voiced by Norio Wakamoto in Japanese and by Steven Blum in English.

Introduced in Metal Gear Solid 4: Guns of the Patriots

Sunny
 is a gifted prodigy. She is Olga Gurlukovich's daughter, kidnapped at birth by the Patriots to manipulate her mother. Afterwards, Raiden rescues her from the Patriots, leaving her in Otacon's care. By the time of Metal Gear Solid 4, she is a gifted computer programmer where it is heavily implied that her status as prodigy is the result of genetic engineering experiments done to her at Area 51 while she was in the Patriots' possession. She along with Naomi Hunter design the FOXALIVE virus which Old Snake uses to disable the Patriots' AIs. Sunny returns in Metal Gear Rising: Revengeance, having been adopted by Otacon. She did attend school after becoming free of the Patriots' AIs, but was considered too "advanced"; after earning multiple degrees, she was hired by Solis Space & Aeronautics. She helps Raiden reach Pakistan to stop Armstrong's plans, later allowing Bladewolf and George to work with her at Solis. Sunny is voiced by Kikuko Inoue in the Japanese version and by Cristina Pucelli in the English translation.

Drebin
 is a weapons launderer that's usually accompanied by his pet monkey Little Gray. In Metal Gear Solid 4, he assists Old Snake by disabling ID-tagged weapons taken from PMC troops. He also provides exposition on the origins of each of the Beauty and the Beast members. Drebin is actually a spy for the Patriots assigned to help Snake defeat Liquid Ocelot. He injects Snake with a syringe with nanomachines that allow Snake to use Drebin's weapons; in addition to secretly containing a new strain of FOXDIE programmed to kill EVA, Ocelot and Big Boss. His name is a reference to film character Frank Drebin in that he issues Snake "naked guns." Drebin is voiced by Keiji Fujiwara in the Japanese version and by Khary Payton in the English translation.

Jonathan
 is a hulking Korean-American who serves as the Rat Patrol team's heavy weapons specialist and has a mohawk in the shape of an exclamation mark. He is named in reference to the lead character of Policenauts. Jonathan is voiced by Hideyuki Tanaka in the Japanese version and by James Sie in the English translation.

Ed
 is an African-American who serves as the Rat Patrol team's sniper and Meryl Sliverburgh's second-in-command. He is a tribute to the Policenauts character of the same name. Ed is voiced by Shōzō Iizuka in the Japanese version and by Dave Fennoy in the English translation.

The Beauty and the Beast Corps
 are a team of female PMC operatives in mechanized suits seen Metal Gear Solid 4. Designed according to their animal designations, each member of the BB Corps featured the likeness of a different real-life supermodel. Their "beast" form is voiced by Shōzō Iizuka in the Japanese version and by Fred Tatasciore in the English translation.

Laughing Octopus
 wears a special cybernetic suit that can imitate the appearance of her surroundings or other people, allowing her to blend in before attacking with powerful mechanical tentacles. She was born and raised in a small Scandinavian hamlet known as the Devil's Village, where the residents habitually eat octopus. A nearby cult took offense to the village's diet and attacked, sparing few, including the young girl. On pain of death, they tortured her into killing her entire family while laughing. This has utterly numbed her to bloodshed and has spawned an obsession with laughter, particularly during battle. The character's likeness was provided by Lyndall Jarvis. Laughing Octopus is voiced by Haruna Aimoto in the Japanese version and by Paula Tiso in the English translation. Impersonations of Otacon and Naomi Hunter are voiced by Hideyuki Tanaka and Hiromi Tsuru in Japanese and by Christopher Randolph and Jennifer Hale in English.

Raging Raven
 is capable of true flying capabilities that utilizes UCAVs and a grenade launcher to attack her enemies. Born in Aceh, Indonesia, she was taken as a prisoner of war as a child. After enduring months of torture and starvation, her captors abruptly abandoned the prison, leaving her and the other child prisoners to be eaten alive by ravens. She was the last living child; though instead of eating her, the ravens peck away her bonds. She finds her captors' base camp and kills all soldiers and civilians present. Raging Raven is voiced by Yumi Kikuchi in the Japanese version (who also provided the character's likeness) and by Nika Futterman in the English translation.

Crying Wolf
 is the strongest member as she can attack with a railgun or sheer brute force. She is also endowed with a strong sense of smell, enough to identify and track her quarry by scent in a snowstorm. She was born in an unnamed country ripped by civil war. After her family was killed in an attack, she fled the village with her baby brother and became a refugee. When hiding from an enemy unit in a shack, her brother began to cry; she covered his mouth to silence him and accidentally killed him. Upon reaching a refugee camp, she was driven insane by her grief and by the cries of children. She experienced visions of a wolf killing the children of the camp; in reality, it was she who did so. The character's likeness was provided by Mieko Rye. Crying Wolf is voiced by Eriko Hirata in the Japanese version and by Debra Wilson in the English translation.

Screaming Mantis
 is the group's leader. Able to float by using unknown abilities, she has the power to crush people at will and manipulate soldiers to do her bidding, including killing their former allies. She has two puppets shaped like previous Metal Gear Solid bosses Psycho Mantis and The Sorrow. It is revealed that the Psycho Mantis puppet is used to control and manipulate living people while The Sorrow puppet can be used to manipulate dead bodies. However, her powers are only applicable on people implanted with nanomachines and cannot affect people who can suppress nanomachine activity. It is also revealed that Psycho Mantis was controlling her mind as a result of her insanity. The character's likeness was provided by Scarlett Chorvat. Screaming Mantis is voiced by Mao Yuki in the Japanese version and by Andrea Zafra in the English translation.

Introduced in Metal Gear Solid: Peace Walker

Kazuhira Miller
Properly introduced in the prequel Metal Gear Solid: Peace Walker, he serves as second-in-command in the Militaires Sans Frontières mercenary group within Mother Base. His backstory reveals his upbringing as the son of a US officer and a Japanese woman and also notes his brief service in the JSDF. Unlike Big Boss, Kaz is initially characterized as idealistic, believing in MSF's idea of a nation for soldiers free of political ideology. However, he's naïve in underestimating Cipher and assumed he can maintain a business relationship over Zero's organization. This would come into full effect with Miller in Metal Gear Solid V. Following MSF's destruction, Miller gets embittered, seeing the concept of a nation for soldiers appropriated by other groups and reduced to being mercenary bands before he's rescued by Venom Snake from Soviet forces, enabling him to help in the new Diamond Dogs mercenary group's expansion, wearing a large trenchcoat and beret while walking with a limp having lost his left leg and right arm. Miller is deeply distrusting of anyone affiliated with Cipher, accusing the likes of Huey and Quiet of betrayal and calling for the defectors' deaths. Miller takes little satisfaction with vengeance on Skull Face but nevertheless believes in Diamond Dogs' cause. However, his faith is shaken with the revelation that Snake is actually a body double prompts Miller to reject Big Boss, acting as Solid Snake's mentor in Metal Gear 2 and later murdered for Liquid Snake's identity theft in Metal Gear Solid. Kazuhira Miller is voiced by Tomokazu Sugita in the Japanese version and by Robin Atkin Downes in the English translation.

Amanda
 assumes command of the FSLN after her father (their leader) is killed. After many of her members were forced out of Nicaragua by government forces, the KGB comes to the Sandinistas' aid by having them operate a banana plantation that is actually a front for drug-trafficking operations to generate funds for their rebel activities. During Metal Gear Solid: Peace Walker, Amanda shows a romantic interest in Naked Snake when Snake frees the Sandinista survivors from the Peace Sentinels. Towards the end of the game, Amanda leads the Sandinistas into fighting the KGB. In the game, the player can use Amanda to motivate former guerrillas recruited into the MSF. In Ground Zeroes, Amanda is stated to be working on MSF's Cuban operations. Amanda Libre is voiced by Romi Park in Japanese and by Grey DeLisle in English.

Chico
, nicknamed , is Amanda's younger brother. During Peace Walker, he tries to prove himself to his sister and the FSLN rebels despite his age. An argument results in Chico wandering around the forest and his capture by the Peace Sentinels. He also talks to Naked Snake about sightings of the Peace Walker AI weapon (which he calls "El Basilisco"). Chico has an interest in cryptozoology, is the one who briefs Snake on Monster Hunter missions and is in love with Paz Andrade. In Ground Zeroes, Chico is imprisoned and tortured in the military camp Camp Omega after trying to rescue Paz. It is also implied by tapes that he was forced to have sexual intercourse with Paz. He is aboard Big Boss's helicopter when it crashes into the Caribbean Sea; The Phantom Pain states that he did not survive, although Chico was planned to appear as an adult as seen in concept art. Chico is voiced by Kikuko Inoue in Japanese and by Antony Del Rio in English.

Huey
, nicknamed , is a wheelchair-using scientist who was born paraplegic due to having an abnormal spine, the son of a Manhattan Project scientist, and the father of Hal Emmerich. Previous games alluded his character; Metal Gear Solid revealed he was born on the same day as the Hiroshima attack, Metal Gear Solid 2 revealed that he committed suicide by drowning after finding out that his son was having an affair with his second wife, and Metal Gear Solid 3 alluded to the character as Granin's friend in the United States. In Metal Gear Solid: Peace Walker, he and Strangelove are responsible for building the Peace Sentinels' AI weapons for Coldman and later MSF's own Metal Gear ZEKE for Naked Snake. In a personal letter he wrote to Strangelove, which he asks Snake to deliver, it is revealed that they worked together while in NASA and Huey expressed much interest in Strangelove. Huey remains with Big Boss and MSF during Metal Gear Solid V: Ground Zeroes, working to hide MSF's nuclear capabilities from the United Nations. He is present when MSF is attacked by the XOF forces, though Metal Gear Solid V: The Phantom Pain confirms that Emmerich managed to escape the chaos, eventually developing a cybernetic leg-harness to gain the ability to walk. Emmerich maintains that he was misled by Cipher and abducted to work on the new model Metal Gear Sahelanthropus in Afghanistan for Skull Face, where he is rescued and detained by Diamond Dogs. He resumes his work for Diamond Dogs, but he faces with constant interrogation and lingering doubts about his allegiances, ultimately coming to view Diamond Dogs as being no different to Coldman or Cipher. Emmerich is accused by Diamond Dogs of murdering Strangelove and facilitating the attack on MSF for Cipher in exchange for his own safety, and is later found guilty of triggering a deadly new mutation in the vocal cord parasites that results in Venom Snake being forced to execute his own men and prevent them from escaping into the world. As punishment, Snake chooses to exile Emmerich from Diamond Dogs and sends him away in a single small lifeboat. Emmerich is forced to dump his leg-harness into the water to prevent the lifeboat from sinking, leaving him wheelchair-bound once more. Huey is voiced by Hideyuki Tanaka in Japanese and by Christopher Randolph in English.

Coldman
 is depicted as a former director of the CIA sent to manage the CIA's Latin America operations, and is one of the main antagonists in Peace Walker. Because of bitterness over the demotion, Coldman plans to use the Peace Sentinels and the Peace Walker Project to regain his status as a power player in Washington. The true reason behind his exile was because he planned Operation Snake Eater. Late in the game, Coldman dies of Zadornov's gunshots, after inputting Peace Walker's nuclear launch codes and leaking the false data to NORAD. Coldman is voiced by Mugihito in Japanese and by H. Richard Greene in English.

Zadornov
 is one of the main antagonists in Metal Gear Solid: Peace Walker. He possesses a red bionic right hand with built-in lighter and also can be launched like a rocket. He and his student Paz Ortega Andrade visit the Militaires Sans Frontières' base in Colombia to recruit MSF's services. Galvez helps out the MSF as they slowly uncover the Peace Sentinels' true motives in Costa Rica. He later unmasked himself as a KGB intelligence operative when Coldman prepares the Peace Walker to attack from inside a US base in Nicaragua. The MSF and FSLN capture him and lock him up at Mother Base, but he breaks out on several occasions and forces Big Boss to recapture him. He is eventually killed by Big Boss in self-defense. Vladimir Zadornov is voiced by Hōchū Ōtsuka in Japanese and by Steven Blum in English.

Strangelove
 is a British AI expert hired to work in the Peace Walker project and the mother of Hal Emmerich. During her stint with NASA in the late 1950s, Strangelove met The Boss and became enamored. She later met Huey while working in the Mercury program. In Peace Walker, her experience with The Boss and subsequent work in ARPA inspires her to create Peace Walker's AI matrix with The Boss's personality years later, which initially puts her at odds with Naked Snake. However, Strangelove joins MSF in helping create Metal Gear ZEKE's AI matrix. Strangelove was not present in Ground Zeroes, having left MSF a week before the IAEA inspection notification arrived due to the AI department not coming up with anything. The Phantom Pain reveals that she retrieved the Mammal Pod from Peace Walker's sunken remains to use as a basis for the Patriots' AI system at Zero's request, and she eventually married Huey and had their son Hal. Despite this, Strangelove reveals that she never loved Huey, and only wanted someone to conceive a child that she would see as hers and The Boss's child. Even after her death – Strangelove couldn't let go of The Boss and always claimed to be forever in love with her idol. When Huey later attempted to use Hal as a test subject for Metal Gear Sahelanthropus, Strangelove intervened and the two began to argue. As a result, Strangelove was locked inside the Mammal Pod by Huey, who left her to suffocate. The Mammal Pod is later recovered and used as evidence against Huey during interrogation. Strangelove is voiced by Yumi Kikuchi in Japanese and by Vanessa Marshall in English.

Cécile
 is a French ornithologist. In Peace Walker, she is caught while trying to record quetzal sounds near an Incan ruin where the Peace Walker Project's AI laboratory is located. Cécile also was influenced by the May 1968 events in France, similar to other Parisian women at the time. The way her name is pronounced is a play on the phrase . She is also named after and visually based on Cécile Caminades, an employee from the Paris branch of Konami Digital Entertainment. Cécile did not appear in Ground Zeroes, as she had been evacuated from MSF and returned to Paris, France in preparation for the then-upcoming IAEA inspection. Cécile Caminades is voiced by Yū Kobayashi in Japanese and Catherine Taber in English.

Paz
 is first introduced in Peace Walker as an innocent schoolgirl at the University of Peace. She is the apparent student of Ramon Galvez Mena (Vladimir Zadornov) as seen to recruit the Militaires Sans Frontières' services in Costa Rica to encounter Coldman's Peace Sentinel AI experiments. In the game's true ending, she is revealed to be an agent of Cipher named Pacifica Ocean. Paz hijacks Metal Gear ZEKE and tries to launch a nuclear warhead at the US East Coast with the intention of framing MSF as being an extremist cult under Cipher's orders. Big Boss defeats her and she is thrown into the water from the force of ZEKE's explosion, although Big Boss suspected that there was a possibility that she survived. Paz provides commentary about her deep-cover mission in a ten-part series of audio tapes called "Paz's Diary". In the tapes, Paz talks about life in Mother Base and her fears about a strong reprisal from Cipher if she blew her cover.

In Ground Zeroes, Paz is found alive drifting in the Caribbean before being captured by Skull Face's XOF group and brought to Camp Omega. During her interrogation she undergoes extreme torture, and the surgical implanting of explosive devices in her abdomen and womb. After learning of her survival, Big Boss is sent to retrieve her and Chico from the camp, believing her to be instrumental in finding and stopping Cipher. But during the two's rescue, however, Big Boss and Chico discover the surgical scars from one of the bombs inside Paz's unconscious body which the medic is forced to remove. While attempting to escape XOF's assault on MSF, Paz awakens and reveals the second bomb's presence before throwing herself from the helicopter in an attempt to save the others from the subsequent explosion which kills her.

In The Phantom Pain, Venom Snake finds Paz apparently alive and recovering as the second bomb was apparently removed as well, though Paz was not aware of this when she jumped from the helicopter, and the explosion was actually caused by an enemy rocket launcher. Paz fell into the ocean, but managed to survive and was later brought back to Diamond Dogs. However, the impact caused her to suffer amnesia due to dissociative identity disorder, forgetting everything about Cipher and believing herself to still be a student in 1974. But when she removes a bomb from her stomach in front of him, Snake realizes that this is just a hallucination brought on by guilt over not being able to save her, and finally comes to terms with her death.

Paz Ortega Andrade / Pacifica Ocean is voiced by Nana Mizuki in Japanese and by Tara Strong in English.

Introduced in Metal Gear Rising: Revengeance

Maverick Security Consulting, Inc.
A private military and security company, Maverick acts as Raiden's primary support team over the course of the game.

Boris Popov
 is the president of Maverick and a former Russian Army soldier. Between the Big Shell incident and Liquid Ocelot's uprising, he helped Raiden rescue Sunny from the Patriots at Area 51, having once been friends with Sergei Gurlukovich. He later founded Maverick after the fall of the Patriots, taking in former members of Big Mama's Paradise Lost army and recruiting Raiden to their ranks. Boris Popov is voiced by Takayuki Sugo in Japanese and by JB Blanc in English.

Kevin Washington
 is a military strategist who briefs Raiden on his missions and provides additional combat intelligence. Prior to his tenure with Maverick, he worked in disarmament, demobilization and reintegration at a NGO with ties to the United Nations, but after meeting Boris and seeing how ineffective the UN was at maintaining DDR, he left and joined Maverick instead. Kevin Washington is voiced by Yuichi Nakamura in Japanese and by Phil LaMarr in English.

Courtney Collins
 is Maverick's lead data analyst. She went to the same university as Kevin who would later recommend Maverick to her following her graduation. Courtney Collins is voiced by Miyuki Sawashiro in Japanese and by Kari Wahlgren in English.

Doktor
He originally served as a walking-weapons researcher in East Germany, but was left jobless after the Berlin Wall fell. He was later hired by a prosthetics laboratory in Dortmund and rises to prominence thanks to his knowledge of robotics and engineering. He is brought on as an adviser to Maverick to provide information on cyborg soldiers, as well as to build Raiden a new body and train him in its use. Doktor is voiced by Mugihito in Japanese and by Jim Ward in English.

Desperado Enforcement LLC
The game's main antagonists, Desperado is a self-proclaimed PMC that actually conducts nefarious schemes. Many of its operatives are bionically enhanced.

Jetstream Sam
 is a master of a Brazilian fighting technique called the "New Shadow School", which had some derivations from a similar Japanese fighting style. Born and raised in Brazil, he is of Brazilian-Japanese heritage. Trained in swordsmanship by his father, who was killed by a former pupil under orders from the local drug cartel, Sam inherits his Murasama sword and becomes a vigilante and mercenary before being forced into service to Desperado by Armstrong. Known by the callsigns "Jetstream" (named after the fast flowing, narrow, meandering air currents in Earth's atmosphere) and "Minuano" (named for cold southwesterly wind that blows in the southern Brazilian state of Rio Grande do Sul and in Uruguay), Rodrigues throws his lot with Desperado for most of the game. Raiden's rivalry with Sam is a major driving force of the plot. Sam is eventually killed by Raiden in a duel, but gifts Raiden his sword, which is eventually used in the final battle with Armstrong. An additional chapter released as downloadable content details the backstory of how Sam joined Desperado. Jetstream Sam is voiced by Hiroaki Hirata in Japanese and by Philip Anthony-Rodriguez in English.

Sundowner
 is Desperado's unofficial leader and part of the Winds of Destruction, a team of elite operatives. His name is derived from a wind condition that occurs in Southern California. Born into poverty in Alabama, he joined the military during his early adulthood. He participated in several conflicts before leaving the service to become a mercenary for various PMCs until the fall of SOP, at which point he became part of Desperado. He wears a series of explosive shields, and his main weapons are two high-frequency machetes that combine into a pincer known as "Bloodlust". He is killed by Raiden during his assault on World Marshall. Sundowner is voiced by Ken Nishida in Japanese and by Crispin Freeman in English.

Mistral
 is the second member of the Winds of Destruction trio, named after the dry northern winds that blow from the Alps to the Mediterranean. Born in Algeria to French and Algerian parents, she was orphaned as a child during the Algerian Civil War, finding and butchering those responsible years later. She briefly served in the French Foreign Legion before being recruited into Desperado by Armstrong. Her cybernetic body is capable of hosting multiple limbs taken off Dwarf Gekkos. Her main weapon is a long staff that also acts as a whip known as "L'Etranger". She is killed by Raiden during a mission in Abkhazia after being doused in liquid nitrogen. Mistral is voiced by Romi Park in Japanese and by Salli Saffioti in English.

Monsoon
 is the third member of the Winds of Destruction, named after the seasonal wind systems that occur in West Africa and Australasia, in addition to being born in Cambodia. His most prominent ability is to magnetically dislocate his entire body to attack from a distance. He can also use smoke grenades for sudden attacks, and carries a pair of dual sais known as "Dystopia". His personality is that of a nihilistic, misanthropic sociopath, which is strongly implied to be the result of his being a survivor and victim of the Khmer Rouge's reign of terror. He is killed by Raiden during his assault on World Marshall. Monsoon is voiced by Masashi Ebara in Japanese and by John Kassir in English.

Blade Wolf
, also known as the IF Prototype LQ-84i, is an unmanned AI weapon in Desperado's arsenal. When Raiden defeats the machine, Maverick rebuilds it as an ally. Nearly being destroyed during the battle with Armstrong, he later goes to live with Sunny at SOLIS. An additional chapter released as downloadable content details part of Blade Wolf's history with Desperado prior to his first encounter with Raiden. Blade Wolf is voiced by Yoshimasa Hosoya in Japanese and by Michael Beattie in English.

Khamsin
 is an unofficial fourth member of the Winds of Destruction (only appearing in the Bladewolf DLC package), named after a hot, dry, dusty south–north wind in North Africa and the Middle East. He was discharged from the Marines due to friction between him and his teammates, and is held in similarly low regard by Desperado. Khamsin's body from the waist down is replaced with connectors to his mech suit, which wields a chainsaw/battle-axe hybrid heavy enough to require built-in rocket boosters to swing. Bladewolf is tricked by Mistral into killing Khamsin, whom she believed to be becoming a problem. Khamsin is voiced by Rikiya Koyama in Japanese and by Benito Martinez in English.

Senator Armstrong 
 is a Colorado senator and the primary backer of both Desperado Enforcement LLC and World Marshal Inc. and the main antagonist of Metal Gear Rising: Revengeance. He seeks to be elected as president of the United States in order to rebuild the country from within, purging those too weak or impoverished to contribute to society. He uses nanomachines to enhance his strength and change his skin to metal, reducing the effectiveness of attacks. He attempts to use Metal Gear EXCELSUS to assassinate the US president in Pakistan, but the weapon is destroyed by Raiden, who ultimately kills him. In the Jetstream DLC, Armstrong is revealed to be the one who cut off Sam's arm. Steven Armstrong is voiced by Unsho Ishizuka in Japanese and by Alastair Duncan in English.

Introduced in Metal Gear Solid V: The Phantom Pain

Venom Snake

Originally a faceless medic, he's a soldier of MSF who fell into a coma after taking a blast meant for Big Boss. During the coma, he underwent facial reconstruction and was subconsciously brainwashed in order to serve as Big Boss's body double distinguished by his bionic left arm, numerous facial scars, and the shrapnel sticking out from his forehead's right side. Snake is the Diamond Dogs' leader with various allies while facing Skull Face's XOF unit and White Mamba. The character is retroactively established to be  in the original Metal Gear game who is killed by Solid Snake. Venom Snake is voiced by Akio Ōtsuka in the Japanese version and Kiefer Sutherland in the English translation.

Skull Face
 is the central antagonist of Metal Gear Solid V: Ground Zeroes and Metal Gear Solid V: The Phantom Pain. The commander of the mysterious Special Forces XOF unit, he is distinguished by his heavily scarred face, hairless head, and his choice of tailored suits over combat fatigues. His identity and nationality are initially unknown, and he claims to have forgotten his native language, though he is able to speak Hungarian and is later revealed to have been born in Transylvania before reverting to Romanian control. These early years were instrumental in forming his identity or lack thereof; unable to establish a consistent identity, Skull Face came to resent cultural imperialism and ultimately Cipher's ideology. His injuries were sustained when a rapeseed oil factory his parents worked in was bombed on suspicion of manufacturing weapons, an incident he describes as an atrocity before admitting the suspicions were correct; he characterizes the incident as a case of the ends justifying the means. Following this, he was taken to the Soviet Union and subject to an early form of "parasite therapy" whereby parasitic organisms were introduced to his body to keep him alive, and was later infected with one of Code Talker's parasites that made it impossible for him to speak his mother tongue. He eventually became a spy and assassin apparently specializing in poisons, killing Joseph Stalin in revenge for the subjugation of Romania. Skull Face considers the fire bombing to have burned the humanity out of him, and tortures his captives to the brink of death in order to see when the hope is extinguished, believing that he can discover the source of his own hope and regain his humanity.

Initially, Skull Face became an agent of the XOF organization created by Zero to covertly help in mission providing Intel, providing support in missions but he grew resentful of the accumulated fame while a lowly information officer would not be remembered due to Cipher keeping him in the shadows. By Ground Zeroes, he is a senior operative working on behalf of Cipher; he expresses dissatisfaction with Zero's leadership, and seeks information that will lead him to Zero. As the commander of XOF, he authorizes and participates in the torture and imprisonment of Paz and Chico, and later leads an assault which results in Big Boss's Militaires Sans Frontières' partial destruction. By The Phantom Pain, Skull Face has fallen out of favor with Cipher and has been exiled to Africa where he revives a project designed to weaponize a parasite as a form of ethnic cleansing as the parasite targets and kills speakers of different languages. He uses this as a pretext to develop a strain of vocal cord parasite that targets English speakers, intending to unleash it against Cipher and start a new Cold War by giving easy-to-make nuclear weapons to minority groups. To do this, he activates the unfinished Metal Gear ST-84 "Sahelanthropus", piloted by Psycho Mantis. However, Skull Face gets betrayed, leaving him crushed under a broken girder while Venom Snake's Diamond Dogs defeats ST-84. Skull Face accepts this defeat, apparent by his quoting of David Bowie's "Space Oddity". Incapacitated, Skull Face begs to be killed but Snake and Kazuhira Miller only shoot him several times with his own gun—detaching Skull Face's right arm and left leg—before turning away and leaving him to bleed to death, however, Dr. Emmerich finishes Skull Face off with another gunshot. His remains are cremated when his body's parasites still exhibited life signs, ultimately ending him.

Skull Face is voiced by Takaya Hashi in Japanese and by James Horan in English.

Quiet

 is a sniper who appears in Metal Gear Solid V: The Phantom Pain. She first appears in the prologue chapter as part of a team attempting to kill Big Boss when discovered by Cipher, but suffers severe third degree burns in the attempt and is only kept alive through parasite therapy that gives her the ability to photosynthesize light, breathe through her skin, cloak herself, and move with superhuman speed and strength. Later in the story, she is defeated by Venom Snake in open combat and is brought back to Mother Base where she eventually starts participating in missions with Snake. The relationship between the two develops from one of mild mistrust mixed with mutual respect to one that is not easily defined but has moments of vulnerability, playful friendship, even romantic tension and ultimately, sacrifice. She is infected with the English-language strain of vocal cord parasites as a means of assassinating Snake, demanding her silence as a means of preventing symptoms from showing. Although Diamond Dogs are able to cure the infection, Quiet refuses the treatment owing to a latent desire for revenge. However, following the mutation of the parasite, she realizes that her silence alone is not enough to prevent symptoms from spreading, and she allows herself to be captured by Soviet forces in Afghanistan. Snake rescues her, but in the process Snake is bitten by a snake and the two are lost in a sandstorm as Soviet forces hunt for them, prompting Quiet to speak English to direct a helicopter to their location, but in doing so awakens the parasite. She disappears after leaving a goodbye message to Snake and vanishes in the desert in Afghanistan to prevent the infection from spreading. Dutch model Stefanie Joosten provides Quiet's likeness, motion capture and voice.

Code Talker
 is a Navajo biologist who specializes in parasite research. Born in 1880, he has survived for over a century due to his research, in which he identified and injected himself with the same species of parasite that gave The End his powers and longevity. Code Talker was ordered by Skull Face to duplicate the vocal cord parasite for use in his plan under the threat of the extermination of his people. He was later rescued by the Diamond Dogs and brought back to Mother Base to aid in finding a way to prevent or cure the parasite. Code Talker is voiced by Osamu Saka in Japanese and by Jay Tavare in English.

Skulls
They move at high speeds and possess glowing aqua eyes due to being purposefully infected by a strain of Code Talker's parasites, granting them enhanced abilities at the cost of their minds; these abilities included camouflage, corrosive gas projection, shapeshifting, and a thick metallic armor. They are encountered by Venom Snake repeatedly during The Phantom Pain, notably during the rescue of Kazuhira Miller and during the extraction of Code Talker.

D.D.
D.D., short for Diamond Dog, is a trained wolf who assists Diamond Dogs in The Phantom Pain. Venom Snake finds the orphaned puppy on the field and brings him back to Diamond Dogs, where Ocelot trains him to support on missions. As an adult, D.D. wears an eye patch similar to Snake's.

Groups and organizations

Outer Heaven
 is Big Boss's ideology throughout the Metal Gear titles.

The original iteration is initially a fictional nation-state that serves as the original Metal Gear game's setting located 200 kilometers north of the fictional region of Garzburg, South Africa. A legendary mercenary financed the nation's establishment to attract disillusioned soldiers, with a massive fortress as its centerpiece. Its potential threat to world affairs is boosted with the deployment of the TX-55 Metal Gear, a bipedal tank capable of launching a nuclear strike from anywhere on the planet. In the game, FOXHOUND commander Big Boss ordered rookie agent Solid Snake to infiltrate the mercenary state and destroy Metal Gear. After Snake successfully defies expectations and destroys Metal Gear, the nation's apparent leader confronts Snake but is ultimately defeated with Outer Heaven destroyed as well.

The concept continued in Metal Gear 2: Solid Snake with the fortified nation  in Central Asia. Zanzibar Land declared themselves a nuclear power thanks to Metal Gear D provided by Big Boss, but his former subordinate infiltrates Zanzibar, and defeats both Metal Gear and Big Boss.

Subsequent concepts of the ideology continue in the first two Metal Gear Solid games where Liquid Snake's FOXHOUND takes over Shadow Moses Island in Metal Gear Solid to threaten the world with Metal Gear REX and Solidus Snake's plan in Metal Gear Solid 2 to detonate an electromagnetic pulse on New York to destroy the Patriots' AI systems; both plans are foiled by Solid Snake and his allies.

Outer Heaven's origins are depicted in Metal Gear Solid: Portable Ops as Naked Snake's response to Gene's "Army Heaven"; the former is given data with resources/personnel after the latter's defeat.

A new iteration appears in Metal Gear Solid 4: Guns of the Patriots as Liquid Ocelot's mother company that runs five PMCs (Praying Mantis, Pieuvre Armement, Raven Sword, Werewolf and Otselotovaya Khvatka) thanks to a weak spot within the Patriots' AI network. After Old Snake and Otacon use the FOXALIVE virus to destroy the Patriots, Ocelot believes Big Boss's dream is finally achieved.

FOXHOUND

, alternatively spelled "FOX-HOUND" or "FOX HOUND", is a US Army elite special forces unit that has appeared in numerous forms throughout the Metal Gear series. FOXHOUND was originally established in 1990 according to the Metal Gear 2 user's manual to cope with local revolutions, regional complications, and global terrorist activities; Metal Gear Solid 3 would later retcon the year FOXHOUND was established, stating in the ending timeline that FOXHOUND was established in 1971. This unit specializes in black ops, carrying out top-secret operations within "unauthorized" combat zones which are too politically sensitive to intervene in through conventional means. In the MSX2 versions of Metal Gear and Metal Gear 2, FOXHOUND members are often referred to as "FOX HOUNDERS", although this term fell into disuse in later versions.

In the original Metal Gear game, FOXHOUND has Big Boss as the team's commanding officer while Solid Snake and Gray Fox serve as field operatives. However, Big Boss betrays the unit in the end of the game. In Metal Gear 2: Solid Snake, Roy Campbell went from the unit's executive officer to the new commanding officer while drill instructor Master Miller and military strategist George Kasler form part of Solid Snake's support crew in the game.

The FOXHOUND unit turns rogue in Metal Gear Solid as the  under Liquid Snake's leadership (Revolver Ocelot, Psycho Mantis, Sniper Wolf, Vulcan Raven and Decoy Octopus) involved in a terrorist revolt on Shadow Moses Island in the hopes of threatening the rest of the world with Metal Gear REX as a second "Outer Heaven" but were defeated/killed by Solid Snake with help from Otacon, the Cyborg Ninja and Meryl Silverburgh.

Outside the Metal Gear series, FOXHOUND is mentioned in Snatcher as a military unit that JUNKER Chief Benson Cunningham previously served; and in Policenauts as Meryl's former unit (the character being the basis for Meryl Silverburgh in Metal Gear Solid, has a paint tattoo of the team's original logo).

The Patriots

In Metal Gear Solid 2, the Patriots manipulate the story's events. During the Tanker incident, they begin a smear campaign against Solid Snake to frame Philanthropy for an oil tanker's destruction in New York. But Philanthropy acquires a disk containing the Wisemen's Committee identities and learns that all 12 members have been dead for "about a hundred years".

Metal Gear Solid 4 revealed that the Patriots were created from Zero's paranoia in the form of four computer AIs: TJ, TR, AL and GW controlled by fifth proxy AI JD. The AIs originally were created to carry out Zero's own will due to his increasing age and his skepticism that human subordinates would be able to do so. But over time, the system evolved from simply maintaining economic and political systems into creating an entirely new world order based on war economies, something not even Zero himself envisioned. Fortunately, the Patriots' network is shut down when Naomi Hunter's and Sunny's FOXALIVE computer worm used GW as a conduit to access the others. The Patriots' demise is further ensured with Zero's death at Big Boss's hands.

The Patriots' AI in Metal Gear Solid 2 were voiced by Takeshi Aono and Kikuko Inoue in the Japanese version and by Paul Eiding and Lara Cody in the English translation.

Philanthropy
 is a U.N. recognized anti-Metal Gear organization in Metal Gear Solid 2. Its primary members consist of Solid Snake, Hal "Otacon" Emmerich and Mei Ling. A large amount of the startup funds for the organization were provided by Nastasha Romanenko. Philanthropy is an NGO (non-government organization), which means that while the U.N. recognizes its existence, it has no official government backing. As Philanthropy is a semi-clandestine organization, Otacon must sometimes obtain equipment and information through less-than-legal methods; Snake mentions that on more than one occasion, Otacon has hacked classified networks to 'appropriate' experimental technology. In addition, it was also involved in activities comparable to terrorism.

The Philosophers

The group's amassed amount totaled 100 billion dollars to fund war efforts and research; this sum became known as the "Philosopher's Legacy". After the original members' deaths during the 1930s, their followers began fighting amongst themselves to inherit the fund left by the original members. In Metal Gear Solid 3, Volgin uses the Philosopher's Legacy to create the fortress  within the Soviet branch with the Shagohod and The Boss as collateral. Naked Snake retrieves the Philosophers' Legacy after the defeats of Volgin and The Boss for the American branch; however, EVA manages to obtain the data for the Chinese branch. The game's ending timeline establishes that a reorganized American branch (later retconned to Cipher) gets formed after accumulating the missing fund; Metal Gear Solid: Portable Ops changes this by showing Ocelot killing the DCI to end the Philosophers and obtains documents containing the Philosophers' identities and the location of the organization's funds.

FOX
The  is introduced in Metal Gear Solid 3 as Zero's special forces unit with Naked Snake as its first agent with Para-Medic and Sigint for additional support. The FOX unit turns renegade in Portable Ops under Gene's ultimate goal of  that would in fact victimize soldiers in pursuit of Gene's goals. In response, Naked Snake and Roy Campbell form their own team of specialists which goes on to become the FOXHOUND unit. Big Boss wears the FOX unit's shoulder sleeve insignia on the right side of his uniform in Peace Walker and Ground Zeroes. 

A covert strike called XOF is seen in Metal Gear Solid V under Skull Face's leadership. Originally a support network for FOX, XOF secretly continued carrying out ultra-sensitive and illegal operations as a covert division of Cipher. XOF carry out extremely sensitive black operations before having gone rogue as shown when they remove all of identifying markings from both personnel and equipment. After carrying out a successful assault on the MSF's destruction, XOF are eventually destroyed by the Diamond Dogs led by Venom Snake in The Phantom Pain. 

FOX's insignia is a stylized yellow fox on a black background while XOF's insignia is a black fox on a yellow background.

MSF
 is Naked Snake's mercenary group in Metal Gear Solid: Peace Walker. Per The Boss's will, Snake conceptualized MSF as capable of providing combat support to any individual or country, regardless of other factors. Kaz Miller helps develop MSF into a private military contractor offering a wide range of services on their  in the Caribbean Sea thanks to Vladimir Zadornov and Paz Ortega Andrade during Coldman's Peace Sentinel takeover within Costa Rica and later the MSF's own housing of Metal Gear ZEKE. Metal Gear Solid V: Ground Zeroes shows the MSF unit is all but gone when the mysterious XOF organization attacks; many of the MSF personnel on assignment at the time of the attack return right away. They are disheartened by Big Boss's apparent death and later move on to work in other mercenary outfits. Militaires Sans Frontieres is a play on words on the humanitarian-aid non-governmental organization Médecins Sans Frontières dedicated to assisting countries ravaged by war and epidemics that are in need of doctors and medical experts. The HD Edition version of Peace Walker displays an announcement before the title screen stating that the fictional mercenary group is not in any way linked to the real group. Despite this, the fictional group is never mentioned by name in Metal Gear Solid V and the unit's emblem was modified to omit it. The group is renamed "Out Of Order" in the Japanese language novelizations of Peace Walker and The Phantom Pain authored by Hitori Nojima, and appears in the subtitles for the Japanese version of The Phantom Pain but is never spoken by the actual characters. The MSF's logo is a skull stylized after Pangaea inside a yellow and black circle.

Cipher
 is an American covert intelligence agency that served as the Philosophers' reorganized American branch as well as the Patriots' precursor. The group is officially mentioned in Metal Gear Solid: Peace Walker and referenced throughout most of Metal Gear Solid V: Ground Zeroes and Metal Gear Solid V: The Phantom Pain. The organization is initially formed by Zero with Big Boss to fulfill The Boss's ideal of a unified world. Cipher eventually grew too powerful and greedy to control everything, as seen with Donald Anderson/Sigint and Dr. Clark/Para-Medic. A fallout occurred where Big Boss and Zero interpreted The Boss's will differently; Zero taking the concept to mean control of the entire world to ensure unification, whereas Big Boss believed that The Boss's will wanted a world where soldiers were not used as tools by the government with Revolver Ocelot and EVA as additional support. Cipher has Pacifica Ocean oppose and frame MSF via Metal Gear ZEKE against the East Coast while Kazuhira Miller is a neutral business partner, and later eventually ends up disorganized by Skull Face's ambitions.

Diamond Dogs 

The  is a splinter organization made from MSF's surviving remnants under Venom Snake's command in Metal Gear Solid V: The Phantom Pain. Diamond Dogs is based out of a new Mother Base in the Seychelles (given out of gratitude for their assistance in fighting off a coup) with Kaz Miller and Revolver Ocelot both as second in command. The Diamond Dogs' logo consists of a profile shot of a Rhodesian Ridgeback dog sat upon a cut diamond, finished off with a yellow scroll featuring the words "Diamond Dogs."

Reception
The characters from the Metal Gear series have been well received by gamers with Solid Snake and Raiden appearing in a Famitsu poll that listed the fifty best video game characters; while the former was at the top, the latter was 42nd. Solid Snake has also appeared in multiple lists of best characters in gaming history, while Raiden and Revolver Ocelot were found as characters who should have their own spin-off games. While the variety of characters have been noted, publications often found some out of place as a result of their abilities and confusing changes occurring within them. The characters have also been praised for their actions within fight scenes, resulting in appealing cutscenes. 
The bosses have been praised not only for the requirements for defeating them, but also for the importance they have within the story. Various feature articles by video game publication have made articles regarding who is the best boss character within the series, but results have varied. During 2004, The Boss was awarded "Best New Character" by GameSpot for her role in Metal Gear Solid 3: Snake Eater. In 2013, GamesRadar praised the character roles of Revolver Ocelot/Liquid Ocelot, Psycho Mantis, The Boss and Steven Armstrong, placing them in their list of 100 best villains in video games.

References

Metal Gear